Sangram Shah was a king of the Garha Kingdom of Gondwana, in the state of Madhya Pradesh, India. Sangram Shah, who belonged to the Gond Dynasty in central India, was the 48th and most well known ruler of the dynasty, and during his reign he had conquered 52 forts to strengthen his kingdom. The Chouragarh Fort in Narsinghpur was built in his honour for conquering 52 forts. 

His eldest son, Dalpat Shah, married Rani Durgavati.

Early life
Sangram Shah was born as Aman Das, elder son of the king of Garha-Mandla. 

Abul Fazl tells a tale as follows-  He was born as Aman Das, elder son of the king of Garha-Mandla. He was later awarded the title of Sangram Shah by Sultan Bahadur Shah of Gujarat, for helping him in conquering Raisen. Sangram Shah had been a self-indulging youth, whom his father had locked up to save him from himself. However, Sangram Shah managed to escape and enlisted himself in the service of Birsingh Deo, the Baghela raja of Rewa, who adopted him. While Birsingh Deo was away in Delhi serving Sikandar Lodi, Sangram Shah heard that his father was planning to place his younger brother on the throne. He went to his mother's palace stealthily, killed his father and declared himself king. Birsingh Deo of Rewa was horrified and invaded Garha to punish him. Sangram Shah was in no condition to fight against the Baghela forces; hence he pleaded that he had already lost a father and did not want to lose another, somehow convincing the Baghela raja of the sincerity of his repentance. Abul Fazl says- "Aman Das wept continually and expressed his abhorrence of himself for his evil action."

Reign
After Birsingh Deo left Sangram Shah to himself, he started his conquest at the beginning of the 1500s. He was a brave and mighty king and won many battles during his time. Garha-Mandla, which had been a petty chiefdom till this point, was massively expanded by him to include 70,000 villages and 52 forts.  He moved his capital from Garha to the new town of Chauragarh. He soon bordered a small Rajput kingdom called Mahoba, ruled by a king of a minor branch of the Chandela dynasty, Keerat Rai. They conducted a marriage between Sangram Shah's son Dalpat and Keerat Rai's daughter Durgavati, which could be a political alliance. Many tales say that Keerat Rai was not willing to marry his beautiful and skilled daughter to a Gond man (Dalpat Shah), but the alliance helped him negotiate the invasion of Sher Shah Suri successfully. Sangram Shah was best known as a patron of arts and literature and he had great knowledge of Sanskrit. "Rasratnamala" was written by him. While touring Central India, Bhanudatta, author of the Rasamanjari, attended the court of Sangram Shah and sang his praises.

Succession
Sangram Shah was succeeded by his son Dalpat Shah, who would be in turn succeeded by his widow Durgavati after a short reign. Rani Durgavati would further increase Garha's prestige, but would not embark on an aggressive conquest like Sangram Shah, instead opting to remain on the defense in case of any conflict. He also had another son named Chandra Shah, half-brother of Dalpat Shah, to whom the  kingdom was restored after 25 years of Mughal rule and was recognized as the successor of Rani Durgavati by Akbar.

References

1500 births
1542 deaths
16th-century Indian monarchs
History of Madhya Pradesh
Regents of India
Date of birth unknown
Date of death unknown
Place of birth missing
Place of death missing
People from Narsinghpur district